The University of Santo Tomas in Manila, Philippines marks a variety of traditions largely influenced by the Spanish and Filipino Dominican culture. Many are annual events, such as religious assemblies marking the start and end of the academic year, a "welcome walk" for new students, as well as intercollege sport competitions and talent exhibitions. Christmas is celebrated in a month-long festivities culminated by the UST Paskuhan. Many Roman Catholic feast days are also celebrated.

Catholic traditions

Misa de Apertura
Being the Catholic University of the Philippines, UST opens each school year with the Mass of the Holy Spirit. Also called as Misa de Apertura, it is officiated by a Dominican father or a guest clergy at the Santisimo Rosario Parish. The opening is formally declared by the Apostolic Nuncio or his delegate, in consonance with the status of UST as a pontifical university.

In 2012, Apostolic Nuncio to the Philippines, Archbishop Giuseppe Pinto, led the Misa de Apertura and the opening rites of the school year.

Discurso de Apertura
Discurso de apertura consists of a printed extensive scientific paper read by its author at the formal opening of the school year. The professor or dean assigned the preparation of this academic paper is appointed by the rector of the university a few months prior to the opening of each school year.

The Discurso started on July 16, 1866, as an annual event. It was temporarily discontinued in 1929 when Don Nicanor Cortez failed to write his dissertation. Twelve years after, the tradition was brought back with Fr. Angel de Blas, O.P., a psychologist, as the speaker. It was again discontinued in 1942 at the break out of World War II, and resumed later on in 1946.

In 2011, professor Regalado Trota-Jose, archivist of the university, presented documents from the archives regarding the life of the national hero José Rizal in UST.

Replacing the usual Discurso Apertura in 2012 was the inaugural address of Rev. Fr. Herminio V. Dagohoy, O.P. as the ninety-sixth rector of the university.

Feasts

 Feast of St. Thomas Aquinas on January 28 – The university commemorates the feast day with a Eucharistic celebration. In 2011, the yearlong Quadricentennial celebration formally opened on the same day as the feast. It has also been a tradition that the results of the UST Entrance Examination (USTET) for incoming freshmen are released on January 28.
 Feast of St. Dominic de Guzman - August 8
 Feast of St. Catherine of Alexandria - November 25
 Feast of the Immaculate Conception on December 8 – In the feast day of 2010, 24,000 students and university staff formed the Q Rosary, or a human rosary formation in the campus grounds. The event is part of the Quadricentennial festivities and an attempt to enter the Guinness World Records for forming the largest living rosary. However, the university decided to drop the bid due to lack of time to process.

Christmas celebration

The university starts the Christmas festivities with opening of the campus lights and the UST Christmas Concert. The UST Christmas Concert features talents from the UST Conservatory of Music, UST Singers, Coro Tomasino, Liturgikon, Conservatory Chorus Class, and the UST Symphony Orchestra. Traditional Filipino and foreign Christmas classics are performed in the event. At the end of every concert, the UST Symphony Orchestra and performers lead the audience in singing some songs such as 'Ang Pasko ay Sumapit.'

The Christmas Concert Gala began in 2003 when the UST secretary-general Fr. Isidro Abaño, O.P., envisioned a musical concert that would bring together world-class Thomasian talents who would perform for UST students, faculty, alumni, friends, and benefactors. Initially, the concert helped raise funds for the various projects of the university, such as scholarship grants of the students of the UST Conservatory of Music, but since 2008, it has also contributed in UST's heritage-conservation efforts. Maricris Zobel, socialite and an art patroness, has been the co-chair of the organizing committee since then. Proceeds of the Christmas Gala has been allotted for the victims of typhoons Ondoy and Pepeng in 2009, restoration of various paintings, and construction of the UST Museum of Arts and Sciences Hall of Visual Arts in 2011.

Various organizations like the Belo Medical Group, the San Miguel Corporation, the Enrique Zobel group of companies, and the Singapore Airlines have become presenters of the event. In 2010, the Philippine Department of Foreign Affairs hosted the opening of the concert and the Lumina Pandit, an exhibit for the quadricentennial festivities.

At the ninth Christmas Concert Gala on December 1, 2011, the newly installed Martyr's Carillon at the façade of the Santisimo Rosario Parish was rang by the Professor Raul Suñico, Dean of the UST Conservatory of Music.

Paskuhan

Primered by the Eucharistic Celebration, the Paskuhan is the Thomasian way of celebrating Christmas. It is one of the most awaited events of the year showcasing different performances from different student organizations, and live bands, which is complemented with an extravagant show of pyrotechny.

In the 2011 celebration, the crowd was estimated at 100,000.

Baccalaureate Mass
The Baccalaureate Mass for the graduating students is led by the Rector of the university. The mass is followed by the Ceremony of the Light and the Sending-off Rites. The Sending-off Rites is a processional march from the UST Grandstand to the back of the Arch of the Centuries.

The Mass takes place in the UST Grandstand traditionally. In 2016, however, the university decided to hold it in the Quadricentennial Pavilion because of the inclement weather.

School spirit

Alma mater
The UST Hymn is the alma mater song of the University of Santo Tomas. The lyrics were written by Dr. Jose Ma. Hernandez to music composed by the UST Conservatory of Music's first director, Dean Julio Esteban Anguita, and orchestrated by Manuel P. Maramba, O.S.B. Today, only the chorus of the original hymn is being sung and being played.

Thomasian Welcome Walk
The Thomasian Welcome Walk (TWW) is an annual university event that uniquely welcomes new students to the university. Freshmen from all the colleges, including the high school, pass under historic Arch of the Centuries from the España Boulevard side and walk towards the UST Main Building. It symbolizes the linkage between incoming freshmen and their predecessors in the university. The first Walk took place on June 14, 2002, known before as "The Rites of Passage".

ROARientation

University events
There are various university-wide events, among others are:
 Pautakan – A quiz bee among different colleges and faculties. Established in 1977
 Thomasian Youth Ambassador and Ambassadress – The annual intercollegiate search highlights the values in the Thomasian identity of compassion, competence, and commitment organized by the UST Student Organizations Coordinating Council (UST SOCC).
 Himig Tomasino - Annual competition of the different collegiate chorale groups of the university organized by the UST Student Organizations Coordinating Council (UST SOCC).

The USTv Awards 
The USTv Awards or The USTv Students’ Choice Awards is an annual awarding ceremony. It honors television programs and personalities that promote Thomasian values and the teachings of the Catholic Church. Established in 2005, the USTv Awards is the first student award- giving body in the Philippines. In 2014, 35,000 students were expected to participate in voting.

Fireworks
UST began having pyromusical shows in the opening of the Quadricentennial Celebration on January 27, 2011. It was also the first time the Philippines saw a multi-position pyromusical event when the fireworks were launched from the UST Grandstand and Santisimo Rosario Parish. In the Neo-Centennial Celebration in January 2012, the university was also the first to set up a pyromusical in four different structures and buildings. The music and choreography of all the pyromusical events are arranged by Don Miguel Villarosa and the technicals and set-up are done by John Oliver Zeng, alumni of the UST College of Fine Arts and Design. The fireworks off all the pyromusical events are provided by Dragon Fireworks, a local fireworks manufacturer.

The pyromusical display has become one of the most anticipated events during the Paskuhan festivities attracting alumni, visitors, and local media coverage.

Class valedictorians in recent years

Sports
UST's official mascot is the Growling Tiger. Another mascot, Quster, which stands for Quadricentennial UST Tiger, was specially made for the 400th anniversary of the university. In The Varsitarian, UST students are represented by Tomas U. Santos.

Thomasian Goodwill Games
The Thomasian Goodwill Games is a program of the UST Institute of Physical Education and Athletics (IPEA) that seeks to promote the spirit of friendship and unity between students of the different colleges of the university. Sporting events include basketball, volleyball, football, judo, swimming, beach volleyball, and table tennis. It was formally established in school year 2002–2003 by UST judo coach Alberto Arce.

Colleges also have different sporting teams other than the ones mentioned above. Some include tennis and badminton in their college's sport fests.

 Notes:
 Champion team in boldface.
 AB: Arts and Letters; AMV: Accountancy; Arch: Architecture; CBA: Commerce and Business Administration; CFAD: Fine Arts and Design; CRS: Rehabilitation Sciences; CTHM: Tourism and Hospitality Management; Eccle: Ecclesiastical Studies;  Educ: Education; Eng'g: Engineering; FMS: Medicine and Surgery; GS: Graduate School; GS–CL: Graduate School–Civil Law; Law: Civil Law; Nurs: Nursing; Pha: Pharmacy; Sci: Science; UST-HS: UST High School

Dance events
Every year, the UST Salinggawi Dance Troupe, the official dance group of the university holds dance competitions and concerts. Cheermania, also organized by the Salinggawi since 1996, is an annual cheerdance competition of dance groups of the different UST colleges.

Legends and symbolism
Various edifices are adorned by a pattern of a sun, symbolizing the sun of St. Thomas Aquinas. The UST seal itself, is bannered by a sun. The UST Grandstand stage and the Martyrs' Monument have floor designs that feature a sun.

Arch of the Centuries
It has been a superstition that crossing the Arch of the Centuries while still studying in the university would result in a delay of graduation. Another legend says that crossing the arch at midnight will make someone time travel to the Spanish era.

Height of the Main Building
There is an unwritten rule among Thomasian architects that no structure will be higher than the cross of the Main Building. However, many new buildings built since 2000 such as the Beato Angelico Building, Quadricentennial Pavilion, Buenaventura G. Paredes, O.P Building, and the new UST Hospital Building have shadowed the edifice.

Miguel de Benavides statue

University in other languages
The university on its third centennial: El Tricentenario 
Previous names of the faculties and colleges: Facultad de Teología, Facultad de Cánones, Facultad de Derecho Civil, Facultades de Medicina y Farmacia, Facultad de Filosofía y Letras, Facultad de Ingeniería, and Colegio de Bellas Artes
Latin name: Pontificia et Regalis Sancti Thomæ Aquinatis Universitas Manilana (Pontifical and Royal University of Santo Tomas, Manila)
Motto: Veritas in Caritate (Truth in Charity)
Main Building: Tria Haec ("This Three") statues at the Main Building (Faith, Hope and Charity; Three Virtues of St. Paul)
In the Miguel de Benavides Library cornice: "Has tenebrae cingunt mentis caligine terras Hoc Sancti Thomae Universitates Opus: Lumina Pandit" ("Darkness covers this land in a mental mist. This is the task of the University of Santo Tomas: to spread the light.")
In the QuattroMondial monument: Pontificia et Regalis Universitas Sancti Thomae Aquantis Manilana MDCXI. Contemplari et Contemplata aliis Tradere. In Veritate fideles. In Labore proficientes. In Caritate divites ("To contemplate and to hand on to others the fruits of contemplation. In truth, faithful. In an effort to make progress. Rich in Love." According to the main sculptor, Ramon Orlina, the Latin inscriptions represents accomplishment, scholarliness and wisdom.
In San Martin de Porres Building facade: Facultas Medicinae et Chirurgiae, Honora medicum. Opera eius sunt necessaria. Deus autem est qui vitae et mortis. Habet potestatem. Ars longa, vita brevis, occasio fugit, experimentum periculosum, iudicium difficile. (Faculty of Medicine and Surgery, honoring medicine. His works are necessary, God who has power over life and death.)
In the Central Seminary Building: Facultates Ecclesiasticae
Latin honors cum laude, magna cum laude, summa cum laude, meritus, bene meritus, and meritissimus

Sporadic events

Installation of a new rector
The installation of a new rector is a solemn ceremony that marks the beginning of a new term of the Rector Magnificus of the UST. It is attended by representatives from the Commission on Higher Education, Church hierarchy, academic institutions, members of the diplomatic corps, alumni, and the students. One of the highlights of ceremony is the bestowal of the Rector's Collar and two ceremonial maces.

In 2012 and 2016, the installation of Rev. Herminio Dagohoy, O.P., for his inaugural and second term respectively, replaced the Discurso de Apertura.

UST at 500
The UST Neo-Centennial Celebration in January 2012 is week-long festivity that marked the countdown to 500 years. At the end of the pyromusical display on January 27, 2012, "UST 500" was spelled out using indoor fireworks atop the Main Building.

The Varsitarian Neo-centennial magazine supplement released in June 2012 was entitled "Toward 500".

References

External links
 The University of Santo Tomas - Events

University of Santo Tomas
Catholic Church in the Philippines

de:University of Santo Tomas
tl:University of Santo Tomas